Kharkiv Operation may refer to:

Kharkiv Operation (June 1919), offensive during the Russian Civil War by White forces 
Kharkiv Operation (December 1919), offensive during the Russian Civil War by the Red Army
Occupation of Kharkiv (1917), first episode of the Ukrainian-Soviet War

See also
Battle of Kharkiv (disambiguation)
Kharkov (disambiguation)
Kharkiv (disambiguation)